The following is a list of the freeways and tollways in the Dallas/Fort Worth, Texas area:

Interstates

U.S. routes

State highways

Loops

Spurs

Tollways

Gallery

See also 

Texas state highways

References 

 Freeways
Freeways
Dallas - Fort Worth area freeways